Sonning is a village and civil parish in Berkshire, England, on the River Thames, east of Reading. The village was described by Jerome K. Jerome in his book Three Men in a Boat as "the most fairy-like little nook on the whole river".

Geography
The parish of Sonning originally included Charvil, Woodley and Earley and, before the formation of civil parishes in 1866, was a cross-county-boundary parish containing Sonning Eye, Dunsden Green and Playhatch in Oxfordshire as well. It is now much smaller and triangular shaped. The ecclesiastical parish of Sonning continues to include Sonning, Charvil and Sonning Eye. The northwestern boundary is formed by the River Thames before passing through the middle of the Thames Valley Park. The southern border follows the railway line. The northeastern boundary travels over Charvil Hill and follows the edge of the housing at Charvil itself until it reaches the confluence of St Patrick's Stream with the Thames, near St Patrick's Bridge. The northern corner of the parish consists of very low-lying land adjoining the River.

The Sonning Golf Course sits in the southeast corner, with Holme Park, Sonning Hill and the business park in the southwest, and the village roughly in the middle. Sonning village is at a crossing point of the River Thames, where the narrow arched Sonning Bridge on the B478 crosses the river to the hamlet of Sonning Eye on the Oxfordshire bank. Just upstream of the bridge is Sonning Lock. The old village is now joined to further housing along Pound Lane and the A4 Bath Road. It lies some four miles east of the major town of Reading. In other directions, this would put it within the Reading suburban sprawl, but Sonning remains a clearly delineated small village. Most of the village together with the grounds of Reading Blue Coat School forms a Conservation Area.

Transport
See also Sonning Lock
The main road through Sonning is the B478, running from the Bridge to the Charvil roundabout on the A4. The B4446 runs north from the A4 to the village. The A4 itself passes through the south of the parish, as does the main  to Paddington railway line, though there is no station. On the Thames, there are moorings at Sonning, both above and below the lock, as well as in the weir stream.

Local government
Sonning is a civil parish with an elected parish council of nine councillors. It falls within the area of the unitary authority of Wokingham. The parish council and the unitary authority are responsible for different aspects of local government.

Twinning
Sonning is twinned with Ligugé, France. The village has an active Twinning Association and the lane to the village primary school is called Ligugé Way.

Toponymy
Sonning appears in the Domesday survey of 1086 as Soninges.

History
The historical name of the village is Sunning, which is derived from the name of the Old English Sunna. Older, more traditional villagers still pronounce the name of the village in this way and the spelling can be found on old maps and documents. In Anglo-Saxon times, the village was of considerable importance as the lesser centre of the bishopric of Ramsbury, sometimes called the see of Ramsbury and Sonning. The church was a secondary cathedral and the present structure, St Andrew's Church, contains reused Anglo-Saxon carvings. By the 12th century Sonning church had eight dependent churches, four of which had become independent parishes by the 15th century. This is an example of the organisation of the Anglo-Saxon church into minsters with their own parochially known as the minster system.

Sonning prospered as an important stopping post for travellers, both by road and by boat. There were a number of ancient hostelries where they could have stayed, notably the Great House on the site of the original ferryman's cottage. The Bull Inn had the added bonus of being near the church where pilgrims could venerate a relic of Saint Cyriacus. The Bishops of Salisbury succeeded those of Ramsbury and Sonning and had a Bishop's Palace in the village until the 16th century. King Richard II's young bride, Queen Isabella of Valois, was kept captive here during his imprisonment and deposition. Aberlash House is a Grade II listed house situated on an island in the River Thames at Sonning. It was originally built in the 17th century and, like much of the village, was formerly owned by the Rich family, Lords of the Manor of Sonning, although they did not live there.

It was opened in 1840, and was the scene of one of the first railway disasters in 1841, when a goods train ran into a landslip. Nine passengers died in the accident, being thrown from the open trucks just behind the engine. Many were stonemasons working on the Houses of Parliament, and the disaster led to changes in the Railways Act, which required that third-class passengers be carried in stoutly constructed carriages rather than open trucks. The Act also created Parliamentary trains for third-class passengers.

Just outside the village, above Sonning Lock, is the independent secondary school, Reading Blue Coat School, in the 19th century manor house, Holme Park. Built in the 'Home Park' of the old palace, it replaced a Georgian mansion erected for the Lords of the Manor who eventually superseded the bishops. The first of these was Laurence Halstead, partner to the Reading cloth merchant, John Kendrick. In the early 20th century, a second country house was built in the village, the Deanery. It provides a fine example of an Edwin Lutyens house with a Gertrude Jekyll garden, originally designed as a show house for the founder of Country Life magazine.

Sport and leisure
Sonning has a King George's Field in memorial to King George V, where Sonning Cricket Club plays. There are playing fields between Sonning and the main A4 road, including hockey and rugby fields. Sonning Hockey Club, Reading Hockey Club, Reading R.F.C., and Berkshire Shire Hall R.F.C. can all be found on Sonning Lane. Sonning Hockey Club was the first club in the county of Berkshire to be awarded Club 1st National Hockey Accreditation for junior coaching and development. Sonning Hockey Club also has squash courts and tennis courts.

Redingensians R.F.C. is nearby, off the Old Bath Road. Sonning Golf Club is on the other side of the A4 road. Sonning Regatta restarted in 2000 and is held every two years just upstream from Sonning Lock. There is sailing and waterskiing on the Caversham Lakes across the river Thames and the Redgrave Pinsent Rowing Lake has recently been created there as well. Sonning Parish Magazine, established in 1869, serves Sonning and the neighbouring village of Charvil, and the Sonning Village Show is held every September at the village primary school.

Notable residents

Notable former and current village inhabitants include:
 Nigel Broackes, the managing director of Trafalgar House
 George Clooney, American film star and his wife, human rights lawyer Amal Clooney
 US General Dwight D. Eisenhower, before D-Day, in The Grove
 Anthony Farindon, 17th-century Royalist preacher
 Uri Geller, Israeli illusionist, magician, television personality, and self-proclaimed psychic
 Laurence Halstead, 17th-century cloth merchant and partner of philanthropist, John Kendrick
 Neil Hamilton Fairley, Australian physician and soldier
 Glenn Hoddle, football manager and former footballer
 William Holman Hunt, the Pre-Raphaelite artist, in his later life at The Acre
 Isabella of Valois, Queen consort of Richard II
 Ric Lee, drummer for the 1970s group Ten Years After
 Jon Lord, composer and founder member of the 1970s group Deep Purple
 Philip May, investment relationship manager and the husband of former Prime Minister Theresa May
 Theresa May, British Prime Minister 2016–2019, is the local Member of Parliament; she and her husband live in the village.
 Jimmy Page, lead guitarist of the rock group Led Zeppelin
 Hugh Pearson, Victorian vicar of Sonning, later a Canon at Windsor Castle
 Terence Rattigan, dramatist, briefly at The Red House during 1945-47 – there is a blue plaque
 Thomas Rich, 17th-century merchant, money-lender to the King and benefactor to both Sonning and Gloucester
 Dick Turpin, reputedly, at his aunt's house, now called Turpins
 Admiral Villeneuve, subsequent to his capture at the Battle of Trafalgar, at The Grove
 Robert Wright, 17th-century Bishop of Lichfield & Coventry and vicar of Sonning

The following recipients of the Victoria Cross are buried in the churchyard of St Andrew's Church:
 Edmund John Phipps-Hornby
 Llewellyn Alberic Emilius Price-Davies

Bibliography

 Angel Perkins, The Book of Sonning, Barracuda Books, 1977. . 2nd edition, Baron Buckingham, 1999. .

References

External links

Sonning and Sonning Eye Community website
Sonning Parish Council
Sonning Parish
Sonning Parish Magazine

 
Villages in Berkshire
Borough of Wokingham
Civil parishes in Berkshire
Populated places on the River Thames